Silman is a surname. People with that name include:

 Benny Silman (active 1998), jailed for masterminding a point shaving scandal at Arizona State University
 David Silman (born 1959), English footballer
 Idit Silman (born 1980), Israeli politician
 Jeremy Silman (born 1954), American chess player and writer
 Moshe Silman (1954-2012), Israeli activist who set himself on fire and died as a result

See also